The Wheebin Standing stone (or Stane O' Quoybune) is an ancient, tall standing stone located in the parish of Birsay, in the north west of the mainland of Orkney, Scotland. It  was erected in the 2nd millennium BC. Historic Environment Scotland established the site as a scheduled monument in 1937.

Location

Description
The Wheebin stone slopes up slightly towards the north-northwest. It shows signs of severe weathering, with one deep crevice displayed from the middle of the stone to the top. The constant rubbing of domestic animals over the years have polished the surface of the lower half of the stone. 
 The stone had originally been brought from nearby higher ground and placed with its major axis north-northwest  and south-southeast.

The stone dates to the Late Neolithic or Early Bronze Age, around the 2nd millennium BC. Similar standing stones such were typically put up in the later Neolithic period (around 2000 BC). Historic Environment Scotland established the site as a scheduled monument in 1937.

See also
Prehistoric Orkney
Callanish Stones
Stone of Setter

References

Buildings and structures completed in the 2nd millennium BC
Archaeological sites in Orkney
Prehistoric Orkney
Scheduled Ancient Monuments in Orkney
Megalithic monuments in Scotland
Menhirs
Late Neolithic